Wietze is a river of Lower Saxony, Germany, a tributary of the  Aller.

Geography 

The river begins at the confluence of the Edder and Flöth northeast of Hanover near , a district of Isernhagen. From there it flows several kilometres to the west through the southern part of Isernhagen to Langenhagen and from there on only in a northern direction to just beyond the village of Wietze, where it merges with the River Aller flowing from the south.

In the second half of its course the Wietze forms a pronounced depression with a bog-like region known as the Wietzenbruch. Wietzenbruch, a suburb of the town of Celle lies next to it.

See also 
List of rivers of Lower Saxony

References

External links 
Landscape fact file of Wietzenbruch with map from the Bundesamt für Naturschutz
 NLWK water quality report Fuhse/Wietze 2003 (pdf file; 6,30 MB)

Rivers of Lower Saxony
Lüneburg Heath
Rivers of Germany